Monchaux-Soreng is a commune in the Seine-Maritime department in the Normandy region in northern France.

Geography

Population

Places of interest
 The two churches of St.Martin, both dating from the thirteenth century.
 A chapel dedicated to St.Milfort.
 Traces of a feudal castle.

See also
Communes of the Seine-Maritime department

References

Communes of Seine-Maritime